Ole Gjendemsjø Talberg (born 22 July 1982) is a Norwegian football defender who currently plays for Tromsdalen UIL.

He made his first-team debut for Tromsø IL in 2000, and was in the starting eleven for the first time against Rosenborg BK in September. He played in several Norwegian Premier League games in 2000, 2001, 2003 and 2004. He also played for the Norwegian under-21 national team.

He was loaned out to FF Jaro in 2002, and to Alta IF in 2005. He permanently joined Tromsdalen UIL ahead of the 2006 season.

Career statistics

References

Norwegian footballers
Tromsø IL players
FF Jaro players
Alta IF players
Tromsdalen UIL players
Eliteserien players
Norwegian First Division players
Norwegian Second Division players
Veikkausliiga players
Norwegian expatriate footballers
Expatriate footballers in Finland
Sportspeople from Tromsø
1982 births
Living people

Association football defenders